Mimacraea marshalli, Marshall's acraea mimic, is a butterfly in the family Lycaenidae. It is found in Uganda, Kenya, Tanzania, Malawi, the Democratic Republic of the Congo, Zambia and Zimbabwe. The habitat consists of Brachystegia woodland in hilly country at altitudes ranging from 1,200 to 1,700 metres, as well as open woodland.

Adults feed from the secretions of scale insects (Coccoidea species). They were noted to stroke the insects with their antennae while feeding from their secretions. Adults are on wing from October to May.

The larvae feed on dark, blue-green (or black) algae (cyanobacteria) growing on tree trunks. They are brown, densely hairy and very mobile.

Subspecies
 Mimacraea marshalli marshalli (Uganda, Kenya, Tanzania, Malawi, Zambia, north-eastern and eastern Zimbabwe, Democratic Republic of the Congo: Sankuru, Lualaba, South Kivu and Haut-Uele)
 Mimacraea marshalli dohertyi Rothschild, 1901 (Kenya: highlands east of the Rift Valley, Tanzania: north to the Arusha district)

Mimicry
M. marshalli is a Batesian mimic of another butterfly found in eastern Africa, Danaus chrysippus.

References

Butterflies described in 1898
Poritiinae
Taxa named by Roland Trimen
Butterflies of Africa